The 2003 FIFA World Youth Championship took place in United Arab Emirates between 27 November and 19 December 2003. U20 Brazil claimed their fourth title. The 2003 championship was the 14th contested. The tournament was originally planned to be played 25 March to 16 April 2003, but was postponed because of the Iraq War.

Venues

Qualification 

The following 24 teams qualified for the 2003 FIFA World Youth Championship.

1.Teams that made their debut.

Squads 
For a list of all squads that played in the final tournament, see 2003 FIFA World Youth Championship squads.

Group stage 

The 24 teams were split into six groups of four teams. Six group winners, six second-place finishers and the four best third-place finishers qualify for the knockout round.

Group A

Group B

Group C

Group D

Group E

Group F

Ranking of third-placed teams

Knockout stages

Bracket

Round of 16

Quarter-finals

Semi-finals

Third place play-off

Final

Result

Awards

Goalscorers 
4 goals

  Fernando Cavenaghi
  Dudu
  Daisuke Sakata
  Eddie Johnson

3 goals

  Arouna Koné
  Andrés Iniesta
  Daniel Carvalho
  Stephen Elliott
  Leandro Fernández
  Iain Hume
  Nilmar

2 goals

  Osmar Ferreyra
  Anthony Danze
  Erwin Carrillo
  Jaime Castrillón
  Victor Montano
  David Limberský
  Stephen Paisley
  Sota Hirayama
  Mamadi Berthe
  Sergio García
  Bobby Convey
  Alexander Geynrikh

1 goal
 57 players with one goal.

Final ranking

External links 
 FIFA World Youth Championship UAE 2003 , FIFA.com
 RSSSF > FIFA World Youth Championship > 2003
 FIFA Technical Report

Fifa World Youth Championship, 2003
FIFA World Youth Championship
International association football competitions hosted by the United Arab Emirates
FIFA
November 2003 sports events in Asia
December 2003 sports events in Asia